Magenta was the lead ship of her class of two broadside ironclads built for the French Navy in the early 1860s. She served as flagship of the Mediterranean Squadron.

Design and description
The Magenta class were two-decked ironclad ships of the line, much as the preceding  were armored versions of traditional frigates. The ship displaced . The Magentas were equipped with a metal-reinforced, spur-shaped ram, the first ironclads to be fitted with a ram, and they had a crew of 674 officers and enlisted men.

The Magenta-class ships had a single two-cylinder horizontal-return connecting-rod compound steam engine that drove the propeller shaft, using steam provided by eight boilers.

Armament and protection
The main battery of the Magenta class consisted of sixteen  Modèle 1858–60 smoothbore muzzle-loading guns, thirty-four  Modèle 1858–60 rifled muzzle-loading (RML) guns and a pair of  RML howitzers on two gun decks. All of the 194 mm guns and ten of the 164.7 mm guns were mounted on the lower gun deck on the broadside. The remaining 164.7 mm guns and the 225 mm howitzers were positioned on the upper gun deck; the former on the broadside, but the latter were placed on pivot mounts as chase guns fore and aft. In the late 1860s all of the guns on the lower gun deck were removed and their armament was changed to four  RMLs and eight 194 mm smoothbores, two each of the latter fore and aft as chase guns on the upper gun deck. Their final armament consisted of ten 240 mm Modèle 1864–66 guns and four 194 mm guns as chase guns fore and aft.

Construction and career

On 21 July 1875, Magenta was serving as flagship in a naval exercise involving six ironclads – Magenta and five Alma-class central battery ironclads – and a number of smaller ships in the Tyrrhenian Sea off the east coast of Corsica . The ironclads were steaming in beautiful weather at 8 knots in two parallel columns, with Magenta leading one column, followed by Jeanne d′Arc and Reine Blanche, and Armide leading the other, followed by Thétis and Alma. At 12:00 noon the admiral commanding the squadron ordered the screw corvette Forfait, operating as a dispatch vessel, to pass astern of Magenta to receive orders. Attempting to place his ship in the column between Magenta and Jeanne d′Arc, the commanding officer of Forfait misjudged his turn, and Jeanne d′Arc collided with Forfait, her ram bow tearing into Forfait′s side. Forfait sank 14 minutes later, her crew of 160 taking safely to her boats; her commanding officer floated free from the bridge as Forfait sank beneath him, but also was rescued.

On 31 October 1875, an accidental nighttime galley fire started aboard Magenta while she was in port at the naval base at Toulon, France, and spread out of control. Her crew was able to flood her forward gunpowder magazine but could not reach her aft magazine. When it became clear that the ship could not be saved, her crew abandoned ship, and Magenta′s aft magazine exploded shortly afterward, 2 hours 55 minutes after the fire broke out. She sank in 15 meters (49 feet) of water. At the time of the accident, Magenta had a cargo of Carthaginian antiques, notably 2080 Carthaginian tombstones known as the Pricot de Sainte-Marie steles (Tophet, 2nd century BC) and a marble statue of Vibia Sabina (Thasos, c. 127-128 AD), found in 1874 by the Pricot de Sainte-Marie mission.

The wreck was located in April 1994. Fragments of stelae have since been recovered. The statue has been partially recovered, though the head was too damaged to be rejoined to the rest of the statue. The fragments are on display at the Louvre in Paris.

Notes

References

 

Magenta-class ironclads
Ships built in France
1861 ships
Shipwrecks in the Mediterranean Sea
Maritime incidents in October 1875
Ship fires
Shipwrecks of France
Ships sunk by non-combat internal explosions
Shipwrecks containing antiquities